Sir Gurudas Mahavidyalaya, (formerly named Gurudas College of Commerce) established in 1968, is an undergraduate college in Kolkata, West Bengal, India. It is affiliated with the University of Calcutta. It offers undergraduate course in science, arts and commerce. The name commemorates the legacy of Sir Gooroodas Banerjee, the first Indian Vice-Chancellor of the University of Calcutta.

Location
It is located in Bidhannagar, just at 3 minutes walking distance from Bidhannagar Road railway station.

Departments

Science
Computer Science
Physics
Mathematics
Chemistry

Commerce

Arts
Bengali
English
Sanskrit
History
Political Science
Education
Economics
Hindi

Accreditation
Sir Gurudas Mahavidyalaya (Gurudas College of Commerce)  is recognized by the University Grants Commission (UGC).

See also 
List of colleges affiliated to the University of Calcutta
Education in India
Education in West Bengal

References

External links
Sir Gurudas Mahavidyalaya

Educational institutions established in 1968
University of Calcutta affiliates
Universities and colleges in Kolkata
1968 establishments in West Bengal